Juan Soto (born 1998) is a Dominican baseball player

Juan Soto may also refer to:

Juan Soto (footballer, born 1937) (1937–2014), Chilean football forward and manager
Juan Soto (footballer, born 1956), Chilean football midfielder
Juan Soto (referee) (born 1977), Venezuelan football referee
Juan Soto Ivars (born 1985), Spanish novelist and columnist